Partie Traumatic is the debut album by American Indie rock band Black Kids, released by Almost Gold on July 7, 2008 in the United Kingdom, and released by Columbia Records on July 22, 2008 in North America. The album debuted at #5 on the UK Albums chart and placed on several year-end best albums lists.

According to bassist Owen Holmes, the album got its title from an instructional Artie Traum DVD on how to play the guitar which Holmes and Reggie Youngblood rented from their local library. The band played with the name Artie Traum, calling him Partie Traum and eventually Partie Traumatic.

Track listing
All songs written by Black Kids

"Hit the Heartbrakes" – 3:44
"Partie Traumatic" – 3:10
"Listen to Your Body Tonight" – 3:08
"Hurricane Jane" – 4:32
"I'm Making Eyes at You" – 4:30
"I've Underestimated My Charm (Again)" – 3:55
"I'm Not Gonna Teach Your Boyfriend How to Dance with You" – 3:37
"Love Me Already" – 4:04
"I Wanna Be Your Limousine" – 3:16
"Look at Me (When I Rock Wichoo)" – 4:10

Usage in media
"Hit the Heartbrakes" was used in the mobile phone game, First Touch Soccer 2015. "Partie Traumatic" was used in Midnight Club: Los Angeles. "Hurricane Jane" was used in the football game  by Konami, Pro Evolution Soccer 2010. "I'm Not Gonna Teach Your Boyfriend How to Dance with You" was used as The Twelves remix version in the EA Sports game, FIFA 09 and also the 2008 comedy film Role Models.

Personnel 
 Owen Holmes – bass guitar
 Kevin Snow – drums
 Dawn Watley – keyboards and vocals
 Ali Youngblood – keyboards and vocals
 Reggie Youngblood – guitar and vocals
 Makoto Sakamoto - bongos on "Partie Traumatic" and "Love Me Already"
 Producer: Bernard Butler
 Mastering: Chris Potter at Alchemy Studio
 Engineer: Seb Lewsley
 Mixing: Lexxx at Miloco Studios and Olympic Studios
 Assisting: David Emery, Matt Paul, Adrian Breakspear
 Album design: Brendon Clark and Black Kids
 Photography: Dean Chalkley
 Published by Universal Music Publishing Ltd.
 Recorded at West Heath Studios In England

Charts

Honors
Best of 2008 (#4) – New York Post, December 2008 
50 Best Albums of the Year (#39) – The Observer, December 2008 
The 40 Best Albums of  2008 (#22) – Spin, December 2008 
The Top 50 Albums of 2008 (#43) – NME, December 2008

References 

2008 debut albums
Black Kids albums
Albums produced by Bernard Butler